Mister Peabody Goes to Baltimore is a live album by composer and multi-instrumentalist Joe McPhee recorded in Baltimore, Maryland at the High Zero Festival in 2000 and first released on the Recorded label.

Reception

Allmusic reviewer Eugene Chadbourne called it "a must-have for the free improvisation recording collection. On All About Jazz, Michael A. Parker called it "one the year’s most exploratory, and downright strange, improv records".

Track listing 
All compositions by Joe McPhee
 "Before the Fall" - 33:38
 "Night of the Krell" - 15:31
 "Klatu" - 8:46
 "Homeless" - 3:02

Personnel 
Joe McPhee - tenor saxophone, alto saxophone, pocket trumpet, voice
Jack Wright - reeds (track 1)
Ian Nagoski - electronics (track 1)
Michael Johnsen - electronics, soprano saxophone, musical saw (track 2) 
Sean Meehan - percussion (track 2)
Jerry Lim - guitar (track 3)
James Coleman - theremin (track 3)

References 

 

Joe McPhee live albums
2001 live albums